Francis Acea (born 1967 in Havana) is an artist known for his inspiration by what The Language of Objects in the Art of the Americas describes as "the often anonymous creations of provisional art." Along with artist Diango Hernández, also inspired by the provisional art movement in Cuba, he formed the Ordo Amoris Cabinet. Acea is a graduate of the Havana Superior Institute of Design. As of 2018, Acea lives in New York, NY. Acea has exhibited internationally, solo and group.

Biography
Francis Acea was born in Havana, Cuba, 1967. He graduated from the Havana Superior Institute of Design in 1991. Early works include photography, painting and art direction for art magazines. In 1995, he co-created Ordo Amoris Cabinet with Diango Hernandez. Also known as OAC, the artistic duo rapidly gained recognition exhibiting throughout Europe and North America. Ordo Amoris Cabinet ceased in 2003 and Francis Acea sought asylum in the US. While working in different medias such as painting, installation and photography, Francis Acea shows a keen interested in the collision between art and economics, namely the Art Market. His current works explore the notion of value in contemporary capitalism. In 2004, he created a media company publishing in print and online. As of 2022, Acea lives and works between New York, NY and Florida, FL.

Online Artworks
2022 – Found Objects  Financial history in the making. Found Objects is an NFT collection made of photographs of found coins. 
2022 – Prohibido Olvidar (Coca Cola del Olvido)  Forbidden to Forget is a work that invites to cultivate and preserve the historical memory of the Cuban Exiles.

Media Properties
2022 – Coca Cola del Olvido.  Gift Shop Online Store. Concept Presents, Objects, Art, Multiples.
2021 – One Sun Media Inc.  Boutique media agency. Brands, Products, and Publications. 
2020 – La Nueva Cuba Inc  NPO, Online Academy, and Social Network.
2020 – Unión Constitucional  Online Education about Constitutional History of Cuba.
2020 – Opinión Cubana  Online Newspaper dedicated to Cuban Politics and Economics.
2004 – Miami Art Guide.  Regional Arts Marketing Agency and Online Magazine.

Solo Art Exhibitions
2015 – Black Diamonds: New Works by Francis Acea. Merton D. Simpsom, 2015, New York.
2010 – No Money, No Glory. Holster Projects , London, UK. 2010
2008 – D.B.A Joe. Panamerican Art Projects , Miami, FL. 2008.
2007 – D.B.A nobody. Kunsthaus Miami , Miami. 2007.
2007 – D.B.A Francis Acea. Magnan Emrich Contemporary , NY.
2006 – Safety Box. PM Gallery. Miami, FL.
2003 – Reality. Karpio+Facchini Gallery. Miami, FL
2002 – Sweet Home. Espacio Aglutinador. Havana, Cuba
2001 – Mousepads and Screensavers. ArtPace, San Antonio, Tx
--- Summer Days. Frehrking Wiesehöfer Gallery, Köln, Germany
2000 – A day like any other day. 7th Havana Biennale. 2000
--- Living la vida. Sinpalabras' studio. Havana, Cuba. 2000
1999 – This is a Provisional Fence. Keep Out. Center for the Development of the Visual Arts, Havana
1998 – Antennas: Network transmission / Taxi Limosina. Ludwig Forum für Internationale Kunst , Aachen / Kunsthaus Berlin, Germany. 1998
1997 – Hiking Raffle. Banff Centre for the Arts, Alberta, Canada
--- Reinforced Concrete. Center for the Development of the Visual Arts, Havana, Cuba. 1997.
1996 – Sugar-water and the Provisional Show. Center for the Development of the Visual Arts, Havana, Cuba. Museo de Arte Contemporaneo y Diseno (MACD), San Jose, Costa Rica.
1995 – Una de Cada Clase. Next generation show. Center of Art and Design. Havana. Cuba. 1995
1991 – Cuatro acentos para una exhibicion. Casa del Joven Creador, Havana, Cuba.
1990 – Nunca nadie muere. Posters. Ernest Hemingway Museum. Havana, Cuba.

Group Art exhibitions
2017 - The object and the image (This is not a chair either), Concrete Space Projects, Miami, US
2015 - El Péndulo de Foucault, 12th Havana Biennial, Havana, Cuba.
2015 - Bodegon, Fabrica de Arte Cubano, Havana, Cuba.
2014 - Removal Identity, TUB Gallery, 2014, Miami.
2014 - Iconomania. Merton D. Simpson Gallery, 2014, New York.
2012 - Every Exit Is An Entrance: 30 Years of Exit Art. NY 2012.
2010 - smART. Freedom Tower. Miami, US. 2010.
2010 - Past is History, Future is Mystery. Freedom Tower. Miami, US. 2010.
2010 - A sense of place. Carol Jazzar Contemporary. Miami, US. 2010.
2009 – Gods and Rituals. Holster Projects , London, UK. 2009
--- Primary Colors. Panamerican Art Projects , Miami, FL. 2009.
2008 – AURUM, Gold in contemporary Art , Centre PasquArt , Biel Bienne, Switzerland. 2008
2007 – Killing Time: An exhibition of Cuban artists from the 1980s to the present . Exit Art, Exit Art Underground. NY. 2007
2006 – PULSE ART  Featured Artist Installation. Miami, FL, US. 2006
--- Moving Image. Alonso Art. Miami, FL, US. 2006
2003 – Stretch. Power Plant Gallery, Toronto, Canada. 2003
--- With eyes of stone and Water. Exhibition on tour.
--- Gallery 3,14., Norway. 2004.
--- Ciurlionis National Art Museum, Lithuania, 2003.
2002 – With eyes of stone and Water. Helsinki City Art Museum (Tennis Palace), Helsinki, Finland. 2002
--- La Huella Multiple. International Engravers exhibition, Havana, Cuba. 2002.
--- FITAC. VIII Foro Internacional de Teoría de Arte Contemporáneo. 2002
--- Prophets of Boom. Staatliche Kunsthalle Baden-Baden. 2002
--- Suspended Animation. Karpio+Facchini Gallery, Miami, FL, US. 2002
--- Atravesados. Fundación Telefónica, Madrid, Spain. 2002
2001 – I'm Cuba / Double Play. Tirana Biennale. Tirana, Albany. 2001
--- Short Stories. Fabbrica del Vappore Art Center, Milan, Italy. 2001
2000 – . Center for the Development of the Visual Arts, Havana, Cuba. 2000.
1999 – Cuba presente! Barbican Centre, London, UK. 1999
1998 – Thinking Aloud. Hayward Gallery. Exhibition on tour.
--- Candem Art Centre, London, UK. 1999
--- Kettle's Yard, Cambridge, UK. 1998
--- Cornerhouse, Manchester, UK. 1998
--- Entropy at home. Suermondt-Ludwig Museum, Germany. 1998
--- The campaign against living miserably. Royal College of Art, London, UK. 1998
1997 – The Russian Mountain. Troisieme Manifestation Internationale Video et Art Electronique. Champ Libre, Montreal, Canada. 1997
1995 – Una de cada clase. Next Generation Show. Art and Design Centre, Havana, Cuba. 1995
1991 – Salon 150 Anniversary of Cuban Photography. IV Havana Biennial.
1989 – Salon Construcción de la imagen fotográfica. III Bienal de La Habana, Fototeca de Cuba.
1988 – Revolution by Design. Art & Design College. London, UK.
1987 – Salon de la Nueva Imagen Fotografica. Asociacion Hermanos Saiz. Havana, Cuba.

Awards
01.3 ArtPace International Artist in Residency. San Antonio, Tx, US. 2001
Ludwig Stiftung für Kunst und Internationale Verständigung, Aachen, Germany. 1998
Banff Centre for the Arts, Canada. 1997

Books
Sullivan, Edward J. The Language of Objects in the Art of the Americas. Yale University Press. 2007.
Linda Pace, Jan Jarboe, Eleanor Heartney. Dreaming Red, Creating ArtPace. 2003
Atravesados, Deslizamientos de identidad y genero. Fundacion Telefónica, May 2003.
Prophets of Boom. Staaliche Kunsthalle Baden Baden. Baden Baden, Germany. 2002.

Catalogues
AURUM, Gold in contemporary Art, CentrePasquArt Biel Bienne, Switzerland. 2008
Short Stories. Comune di Milano, Milan, Italy. 2001.
Havana Biennale. Catalogue. 2000.
Trabajando pa'l ingles. Barbican Center, London, UK. 1999.
This is a provisional Fence. Keep Out.  Across Havana in a Limosina. Havana, Cuba. 1999.
Thinking Aloud. Hayward Gallery Publishing London, UK. 1999.
The campaign against living miserably. Royal College of Art, London, UK. 1998.
The love order. Ludwig Forum fur Internationale Kunst. Aachen, Germany. 1998.
Reinforced Concrete. Havana, Cuba. 1997.
Utopian Territories. New Art from Cuba. Catalogue. Vancouver, BC, Canada. 1997.

Press Reading
Heather Corcoran. Art.sy Editorial. "Francis Acea".
Irina Leyva. Art Nexus. "Francis Acea". p. 168. N0. 67. Vol 6. Miami FL. 2007.
Dinorah Perez-Rementeria. Arte al Dia Internacional. p. 105. No 121. Miami, US. 2007.
Alejandra Villasmil. Arte al Dia Internacional. p. 117. No 119. Miami, US. 2007.
Olivier Cayron. Art Scenes Magazine. p. 64-65. No 18. Paris, France. 2006.
Marisol Martell. Art Nexus. "Merrill Lynch Arteamericas". p. 114. N0. 61. Vol 5. Miami FL. 2006.
Carlos M. Luis. El Nuevo Herald. "Francis Acea y la realidad cotidiana". January 25. Miami, FL. 2004
Lilian Fontana. "The New Wynwood Art District Circuit". Arte al Dia News. p. 9. Miami, FL. 2004
Miguel Muniz. Milenio. Diario de Monterrey. "Gabinete Ordo Amoris". Interview. p. 46. Monterrey. MX. April 6, 2002.

Cuauhtemoc Medina. "El Ojo Breve. Una isla cada vez mas isla." Reforma Newspaper, 3 de Enero. p. 4c. Mx. DF. 2001
Quinones, Paul. Short Stories: La Fabrica del Vapore, Milano, Flash Art. 2001.
Walter Robinson. "Havana, Art Capital". Artnet Magazine. 2000.
Hilda Rodriguez. "Espacios para una comunicacion deseada". Revista Arte Cubano, No.3, p. 13. . La Habana. Cuba. 2000
Ibem. Frencis Fernandez. p 67.
Antonio Eligio (Tonel). Por la Habana en Limosina. Revista La Gaceta de Cuba, No.6, p. 22. . La Habana. Cuba. 1999
Grant, Simon. Imagination at full stretch. Evening Standard, May 12, London, 1999.
Ian Hunt. Review. Thinking Aloud. Art Monthly Magazine. No.2. UK. 1999
Greess, Gabriela. "Überlebenskunst", Süddeutsche Zeitung (July) Germany. 1998
Naomi Blum. Naomi Blum visited Thinking Aloud with Art Monthly critic Patricia Bickers. Art Monthly Magazine. UK. 1998
Nelson Moya and Luis F. Quiroz. Interview. Revista Fanal (MADC), No.14, p. 24. . San Jose, Costa Rica. 1996.
Molina, Juan Antonio. "Ordo Amoris. Hacia un diseño pragmatico", La Gaceta de Cuba, No. 4. 1996.
Alberdi, Virginia, "The Next Generation", Arte Cubano No. 2. 1995.

References

External links
www.francisacea.com

Cuban contemporary artists
People from Havana
1967 births
Living people
Cuban expatriates in the United States